Priory Community School - an Academy Trust (often shortened to PCSA) is a school in Worle, a historical village close to Weston-super-Mare in North Somerset, England.
The school is an Academy,  part of The Priory Learning Trust, and had 1,264 pupils aged 11 to 16 as of September 2015.
Ofsted rated Priory 'outstanding' in all categories in November 2014. Priory converted to an Academy Trust on 17 August 2011

History and future developments
The school was founded in September 1975, and moved to a purpose-built site during autumn 1977. During the 1980s, the school ran an unusual timetable, blocking an entire half-year to take the same subject at the same time. This allowed both setting and mixed-ability teaching in the same subject. This timetable management was the subject of an Open University module and television programme.

Head teachers / Principals / Heads of School 

 Arthur Spencer: 1976–85
 David Dennis: 1985–2000
 Paul MacIntyre: 2000–03
 Ron Richards: 2003–07
 Neville Coles: 2007-2017
Jane McBride: 2017-2019
Angelos Markoutsas: 2019 -

References

External links
Priory website

Academies in North Somerset
Schools in Weston-super-Mare
Secondary schools in North Somerset
Educational institutions established in 1975
1975 establishments in England